Amund Martin Sjøbrend (born 1 December 1952) is a former ice speed skater from Norway.

Together with Sten Stensen, Kay Stenshjemmet, and Jan Egil Storholt, Amund Sjøbrend was one of the legendary four S-es (which sounds like "four aces" in Norwegian), four Norwegian top skaters in the 1970s and early 1980s. His first international success came in 1974, when he won silver at the European Allround Championships. Sjøbrend participated at the 1976 Winter Olympics in Innsbruck, but had no success there. In 1977, he won bronze at the European Allround Championships.

Sjøbrend was more or less in the shadow of the other three of the four S-es until he had his best year in 1981. That year, he became both European Allround Champion and World Allround Champion. For his accomplishments, he received the Oscar Mathisen Award that same year.

Medals
An overview of medals won by Sjøbrend at important championships he participated in, listing the years in which he won each:

Personal records
To put these personal records in perspective, the WR column lists the official world records on the dates that Sjøbrend skated his personal records.

Sjøbrend has an Adelskalender score of 165.216 points. His highest ranking on the Adelskalender was a twelfth place.

References

External links

Amund Sjøbrend at SkateResults.com
Personal records from The Skatebase

1952 births
Living people
Norwegian male speed skaters
Olympic speed skaters of Norway
Speed skaters at the 1976 Winter Olympics
World Allround Speed Skating Championships medalists